Time Is Money may refer to:

Time is money (aphorism), aphorism that appeared in a 1748 essay by Benjamin Franklin

Music
Time Is Money (SPM album), a 2000 hip hop album 
Time Is Money (Styles P album), a 2006 hip hop album
"Time Is Money (Bastard)", a 1985 single by Swans
"Time Is Money", a song featuring Winston McCall, from the You Me at Six album Sinners Never Sleep

Film and television
"Time Is Money" (DuckTales), a 1988 DuckTales TV film, reedited into five episodes of the series
 Time Is Money (film), a 1923 German silent film
"Time Is Money" (The Price Is Right), a segment game on the game show The Price is Right

See also
Time value (disambiguation)